Spidola may refer to:

 Spīdola (or Spīdala), a witch from the Latvian national epic poem Lāčplēsis
 VEF Spidola, the first Soviet mass-produced transistor manufactured by VEF
 , a Ronis-class submarine of the Latvian Navy

 , an award presented by the Latvian Culture Foundation; see Roberts Zīle
 Spidola (Latvian ship), a Latvian merchant ship that was taken over by Germany in World War II

See also
 Spinola, a surname